Elijah Harvey McGehee (June 11, 1887 – November 2, 1965) was an American lawyer, jurist, and politician. He was a justice of the Supreme Court of Mississippi from 1937 to 1964. He also was a Democratic Mississippi state senator from 1916 to 1920.

Biography 
Elijah Harvey McGehee was born on June 11, 1887, in Little Springs, Mississippi. He was the son and ninth child of John Hiram McGehee, a Mississippi state senator, and Alice Katherine (Ford) McGehee. McGehee attended the schools of Little Springs, graduating from its high school in 1906. He graduated from the University of Mississippi School of Law and began practicing law in Monticello, Mississippi, in 1909. He served in the Mississippi Senate, representing the state's 8th senatorial district as a Democrat, from 1916 to 1920. In October 1937, Governor Hugh L. White appointed McGehee to a seat on the Supreme Court of Mississippi vacated by the sudden death of Justice William Henry Cook. He later served as chief justice of the court. After retiring in 1964, McGehee died on November 2, 1965, in Yazoo City.

References

1887 births
1965 deaths
People from Jackson, Mississippi
People from Monticello, Mississippi
University of Mississippi School of Law alumni
Democratic Party Mississippi state senators
Mississippi lawyers
Justices of the Mississippi Supreme Court